Valentín Elizalde Valencia (1 February 1979 – 25 November 2006) was a Regional Mexican singer. Nicknamed "El Gallo de Oro" (The Golden Rooster),  he was known for his off-key style and his biggest hits included: "Vete Ya," "Ebrio de Amor", " Vete Con Él", "Vuelve Cariñito", "Cómo Me Duele", "Vencedor", " Mi Virgencita", and "Soy Así" (a cover of José José's classic song). Some of his songs were narcocorridos eulogizing Mexican drug lords like Vicente Carrillo Fuentes. He was murdered in an ambush, allegedly by members of the drug trafficking gang Los Zetas, which at that time served as the armed wing of the Gulf Cartel.

Personal life
Elizalde was born in Jitonhueca, a village near of the city of Etchojoa, Sonora. He then moved to Guadalajara, Jalisco, and later to Guasave, Sinaloa, where he, his father (also a singer), Everardo "Lalo" Elizalde, nicknamed "El Gallo" (The Rooster), and brothers resided for a few years. His father died in a car accident on the so-called "Curva de la muerte" (Curve of Death) in the city of Villa Juárez, Sonora. Elizalde's ex-partner and mother of his second daughter, Blanca Vianey Durán Brambila, was murdered on 20 June 2016 in Cajeme, Sonora.

Career

In 2007, Elizalde was nominated posthumously for the Grammy Awards.

Murder

On 25 November 2006, Elizalde’s vehicle was gunned down shortly after leaving a concert in Reynosa, Tamaulipas. Elizalde, aged 27 at the time, was killed, along with his chauffeur and his assistant. It is widely believed that Elizalde was killed for his concert performances of the corrido, "A Mis Enemigos", which contains lyrics believed to antagonize drug trafficking gang Los Zetas. Raúl Hernández Barrón, alleged murderer of Elizalde and member of Los Zetas, was arrested on 22 March 2008 in Coatzintla, Veracruz.

Discography
Albums
Amor que Muere (1998)
Regresan los Mafiosos (1999)
Traición Federal (2000)
17 Éxitos en Honor a mi Padre (2001)
Y se Parece a Ti (2002)
Mi Satisfacción (2003)
Corridos Entre Amigos (2003)
Herencia Mexicana (2004)
Volveré a Amar (2004)
Soy Así (2005)
Vencedor (2006)

Posthumous albums
La Playa (2007)
Lobo Domesticado (2007)
Más Allá del Mar (2007)
15 Éxitos (2007)

References

External links

Death of Valentín Elizalde
Banda Guasaveña
Mexico: Trouble in Culiacán, Pulitzer Center on Crisis Reporting

1979 births
2006 deaths
Deaths by firearm in Mexico
People from Navojoa
Mexican people of Basque descent
People murdered by Mexican drug cartels
Mexican murder victims
Singers from Sonora
20th-century Mexican male singers
People from Etchojoa Municipality
People from Guadalajara, Jalisco
People from Guasave